Art Plunkett (born March 8, 1959) is a former American football tackle. He played for the St. Louis Cardinals from 1981 to 1984 and for the New England Patriots in 1985 and 1987.

References

1959 births
Living people
Players of American football from Chicago
American football tackles
UNLV Rebels football players
St. Louis Cardinals (football) players
New England Patriots players